Daniel James Wisler (born September 10, 1980) is an American actor, best known for his recurring role in the television series The Unit, in which he played Jeremy Erhart, an Army veteran. He appeared in six episodes.

Wisler has also appeared in other films and television series, and starred in the 2008 TV film Troglodyte, as Danny, renamed Sea Beast in 2009 as the DVD title.

Filmography

External links

1980 births
Living people
American male film actors
American male television actors
Male actors from Ohio
People from Fairfield, Ohio